List of future or planned Canadian Armed Forces projects.

Canadian Army

Royal Canadian Air Force

Royal Canadian Navy

See also 
 List of aircraft of the Royal Canadian Air Force
 National Shipbuilding Procurement Strategy
 Canada-class submarine, a 1987 proposal for a class of nuclear-powered attack submarines that was cancelled in 1989
 General Purpose Frigate, a failed Canadian procurement project of the 1960s

References

Canadian Armed Forces
Lists of proposals
Military logistics of Canada
Military planning